The Josef Sudek Gallery is near Hradčany (Úvoz 24) in Prague, in a house where Josef Sudek (b. 1896 Kolín, d. 1976 Prague) lived from 1959 until his death. Part of his photographic output was transferred to the MDA in Prague in the years 1978–1988. Since 1989 the MDA in Prague has also administered his flat, where the gallery opened in 1995. Sudek had also a studio in Prague, Na Újezdu 28, which he continued to use for his photographic work (namely the darkroom) after moving to Hradčany, and where his sister and assistant Božena Sudková lived.

Sudek's flat was a popular place for friendly gatherings of many artists, among them the poet Jaroslav Seifert, painter Jan Zrzavý, architect Otto Rothmayer and many others. In the flat, which was gradually filled with numerous paintings, frames, goblets, boxes and photographic tools, originated many now renowned compositions in the series Aviatic Remembrances, Easter Remembrances, Labyrinths and Glass Labyrinths. This flat was also a departure point from which Sudek used to set off to roam the Prague gardens, parks and his beloved outskirts.

Exhibition programme

 Josef Sudek's work (photographic cycles, thematic series, comparative exhibitions).
 Personalities of modern Czech photography, special focus on inter-war years.
 History of photographic Pragensia from 19th century to the present day.

See also
 List of museums devoted to one photographer
 Museum of Decorative Arts in Prague
 The Chateau at Klášterec nad Ohří
 Museum of Textile in Česká Skalice
 The Chateau at Kamenice nad Lipou

Sources

External links
 Official site of the Museum of Decorative Arts in Prague
 Josef Sudek
 Minneapolis Institute of Arts Josef Sudek
  Прага, Увоз, 160\24 Дом Луны и Солнца,Josef Sudek, 1959-1976 год 

Museums in Prague
Art museums established in 1995
1995 establishments in the Czech Republic
Biographical museums in the Czech Republic
Photography museums and galleries in the Czech Republic
20th-century architecture in the Czech Republic